The Nurture Assumption: Why Children Turn Out the Way They Do is a 1998 book by the psychologist Judith Rich Harris. Originally published 1998 by the Free Press, which published a revised edition in 2009. The book was a 1999 Pulitzer Prize finalist (general non-fiction).

Summary
Harris challenges the idea that the personality of adults is determined chiefly by the way they were raised by their parents. She looks at studies which claim to show the influence of the parental environment and claims that most fail to control for genetic influences. For example, if aggressive parents are more likely to have aggressive children, this is not necessarily evidence of parental example. It may also be that aggressiveness has been passed down through the genes. Indeed, many adopted children show little correlation with the personality of their adoptive parents, and significant correlation with the natural parents who had no part in their upbringing.

The role of genetics in personality has long been accepted in psychological research. However, even identical twins, who share the same genes, are not exactly alike, so inheritance is not the only determinant of personality. Psychologists have tended to assume that the non-genetic factor is the parental environment, the "nurture". However, Harris argues that it is a mistake to use "'nurture' ... [as] a synonym for 'environment.'"  Many twin studies have failed to find a strong connection between the home environment and personality. Identical twins differ to much the same extent whether they are raised together or apart. Adoptive siblings are as unalike in
personality as non-related children.

Harris also argues against the effects of birth order. She states: Birth order effects are like those things that you think you see out of the corner of your eye but that disappear when you look at them closely.  They do keep turning up but only because people keep looking for them and keep analyzing and reanalyzing their data until they find them.

Harris' most innovative idea was to look outside the family and to point at the peer group as an important shaper of the child's psyche. For example, children of immigrants learn the language of their home country with ease and speak with the accent of their peers rather than their parents. Children identify with their classmates and playmates rather than their parents, modify their behavior to fit with the peer group, and this ultimately helps to form the character of the individual.

Reception
The Nurture Assumption received mixed responses. The neuroscientist Robert Sapolsky says her book is "based on solid science". The psychologist Steven Pinker of Harvard predicts that the book "will come to be seen as a turning point in the history of psychology".

However, the psychologist Frank Farley claims that "she's taking an extreme position based on a limited set of data. Her thesis is absurd on its face, but consider what might happen if parents believe this stuff!" Wendy Williams, who studies how environment affects IQ, argues that "there are many, many good studies that show parents can affect how children turn out in both cognitive abilities and behavior". The psychologist Jerome Kagan argues that Harris "ignores some important facts, ones that are inconsistent with this book's conclusions".

Harris rejects the idea that The Nurture Assumption will encourage parents to neglect or mistreat their children. She maintains that parents will continue to treat their children well "for the same reason you are nice to your friends and your partner, even though you have no hopes of molding their character. For the same reason your great-grandparents were nice to their children, even though they didn't believe in the nurture assumption".

See also
Nature versus nurture
 The Gene Illusion

Reviews
"Do Parents Matter?", Malcolm Gladwell, The New Yorker, August 17, 1998.
Psychpage review, Richard Niolon.
"Peer Pressure", Carol Tavris, New York Times, September 13, 1998.

References 

1998 non-fiction books
Books by Judith Rich Harris
English-language books
Free Press (publisher) books
Popular psychology books